Boyfriend is the third solo studio album by English singer Boy George, released in April 1989 by Virgin Records, just six months after his previous album, Tense Nervous Headache, which Virgin Records decided to not release in the United Kingdom, due to its lead-single "Don't Cry" performing poorly.

Background and release
Upon a suggestion from Sharon Heyward, head of the Black Music department of Virgin, American producers Gene Griffin and Teddy Riley flew over to London during sessions for Tense Nervous Headache to record four tracks which Boy George disliked. "I thought Teddy and I would write together," he'd later tell in his autobiography Take It Like a Man. "I agreed to sing them if I could work on the lyrics, which I did with little success. I convinced myself the fat beats and production would compensate for the lack of substance. I was wrong. When I received the final mixes I went into depression (...) They'd invested a ridiculous $75,000 and didn't care about my artistic integrity." The tracks were left off the Headache album. Virgin, now refusing to have anything more to do with that album, went ahead and released "Don't Take My Mind on a Trip" in February 1989 in an attempt to recoup their money. Despite it continuing Boy George's disappointing charts performances when it only made No. 68 in the UK Singles Chart, it peaked at No. 5 on the US Billboard R&B Charts and No. 26 on the Billboard Dance Charts, prompting Virgin to go ahead and put a new album together, assembling the four Riley/Griffin tracks on side one, and two previously unreleased tracks on side two as well as two previously released tracks "Girlfriend" from the soundtrack Slaves of New York and "No Clause 28" protest single (No. 57 UK charts, June 1988). The artwork from Headache was simply recycled for the new package, although a slightly different shot from the same photo sessions was chosen.

Commercial performance
The album failed to chart anywhere. A second single "Whether They Like It or Not" was released in Europe in June 1989. "I did the rounds on automatic," Boy George admitted. "It was enough misery to make me finally realize that I knew better." In America, Virgin Records decided to put together the album High Hat, combining the Griffin/Riley recordings with five of the tracks from Headache.

Track listing

Personnel

Musicians Trk. 1 to 4 
 Boy George –  lead vocals
 Lee Drakeford –  backing vocals
 Zan – backing vocals
Marsha McClurkin – backing vocals
Mauricette Martin – backing vocals
 Teddy Riley – all instruments, backing vocals, arrangements
 Bernard Belle – acoustic guitar & backing vocals
 Dennis Mitchell – engineer
 Bill Esses – assistant engineer
 Gene Griffin – production

Musicians Trk. 5 to 8
 Boy George –  lead vocals
 Glenn Nightingale –  guitars and other voices
 Ian Maidman –  bass, keyboards
 Amanda Vincent – keyboards
 Vlas Naslas –  keyboards
 Derek Green –  backing vocals
Carroll Thompson –  backing vocals
Helen Terry –  backing vocals
Beverley Skeete –  backing vocals
Belva Haney – backing vocals
 David Ulm, Carol Steel –  percussion

Production
Gene Griffin - producer side 1 (track 1 to 4)
Vlad Naslas - producer track 5, 7
Mike Pela - producer track 6
Bobby Z. & Jeremy Healy - producer track 8

Charts

Singles

Release history

References

1989 albums
Boy George albums
Virgin Records albums
Pop rock albums by English artists